Symphyotrichum firmum (formerly Aster firmus), commonly known as shining aster, shiny-leaved aster, smooth swamp aster, and glossy-leaved aster, is a species of flowering plant in the daisy family Asteraceae native to Canada and the United States.

Description
It forms large colonies with long, creeping rhizomes. The stem is hairless or it may have stiff, short hairs, often formed in vertical lines. It is sometimes dark red or purple at the nodes (where the leaf connects to the stem). The main vein on the lower leaf surface is hairless or slightly hairy near the tip.

It flowers August through October. The ray florets range from white to pale blue or lavender. The disc florets are yellow to cream-colored, becoming pink or purple with maturity.

S. firmum has a diploid chromosome count with a base number of x = 8 (2n = 16).

Compared to the closely-related Symphyotrichum puniceum, S. firmum is less hairy overall, has denser inflorescences of smaller, whiter flowers, and grows in larger, denser patches.

Taxonomy
Symphyotrichum firmum is closely related and morphologically very similar to Symphyotrichum puniceum (purple-stemmed aster), and is not always treated as a separate species. However, there is little evidence of intergrades between the two taxa, and most sources now treat them as distinct.

Distribution and habitat
Its range is poorly known due to confusion with the closely related Symphyotrichum puniceum. In Canada it has been recorded from Alberta to Quebec. In the United States, it occurs in the Midwest, some parts of the Northeast, and in the Appalachian Mountains south to Georgia. It is more common in the western part of its range.

Symphyotrichum firmum grows in moist and sunny areas such as fens and wet prairies. It is often found growing with S. puniceum. Unlike S. puniceum, it sometimes spreads into drier areas.

Ecology
Bees that have been observed visiting the flowers include the bicolored striped-sweat bee (Agapostemon virescens), various bumble bees (Bombus species), small carpenter bees (Ceratina species), the sweat bee named Halictus ligatus, and Drury's long-horned bee (Melissodes druriellus).

Conservation
, NatureServe listed Symphyotrichum firmum as Secure (G5) worldwide, Vulnerable (S3) in Quebec, and Presumed Extirpated (SX) in New Jersey.

Notes

Citations

References

firmum
Flora of Western Canada
Flora of Eastern Canada
Flora of the North-Central United States
Flora of the Northeastern United States
Flora of the Southeastern United States
Plants described in 1818
Taxa named by Christian Gottfried Daniel Nees von Esenbeck